The 2020 National Premier Leagues was the eighth season of the Australian National Premier Leagues football competition. The league competition was played by eight separate state and territory member federations, namely the ACT, NSW, Northern NSW, Queensland, South Australia, Tasmania, Victoria and Western Australia.

Effects of the 2019–20 coronavirus pandemic
The season commenced in February, with the first games played in the Queensland competition.

The competition was suspended for one month due to the impacts from the COVID-19 pandemic in Australia, effective 18 March to 14 April, and subsequently extended. Apart from Victoria, competitions resumed in the various member federations between late June and late July. In Victoria, preliminary plans for the resumption of competitions for the 2021 season were released in October 2020, confirming that the current season had effectively ended. The South Australian season was temporarily suspended in mid-November for a minimum of two weeks, with the NPLSA in the middle of its finals series.

It was announced on 3 July that the finals series for the 2020 competition had been cancelled.

League tables

ACT

Finals

NSW

Finals

Northern NSW

Finals

Queensland

Finals

South Australia

Finals

Tasmania

Victoria

Western Australia

Finals

References

External links
 Official website

2020
2020 domestic association football leagues
2020 in Australian soccer
National Premier Leagues
National Premier Leagues, 2020